Musaad Aruchi was a Pakistani courier who worked in connection with al Qaeda before his capture in April 2004. Some of his files, secured when he was captured, led to the capture of Muhammad Naeem Noor Khan, who was later released without charge.

It was later determined that Aruchi was the nephew of Khalid Sheikh Mohammed and not a "senior member of the al Qaeda leadership" as previously reported.

Human Rights Watch lists Aruchi as one of detainees in CIA custody.

See also
 Ghost detainee

References 

Pakistani extrajudicial prisoners of the United States
Living people
Year of birth missing (living people)